The 2008 Porsche Carrera Cup Great Britain was the sixth season of the one-make championship. It consisted of 20 rounds, beginning on 29 March at Brands Hatch and finishing on 21 September at the same venue. The series supported the British Touring Car Championship throughout the season. Tim Harvey claimed his first title, having finished as runner-up to Richard Westbrook in 2004, Damien Faulkner in 2006 and James Sutton in 2007, Michael Caine finished the season as runner-up. Other front runners throughout the season were Sam Hancock, Tim Bridgman and Phil Quaife. Guest drivers Stefan Hodgetts, son of former British Touring Car champion Chris, and Nick Tandy were also victorious. Former BTCC race winner Paul O'Neill was another notable guest driver.

Entry List
 All drivers raced in Porsche 911 GT3s.

Race results
All races were held in the United Kingdom.

Championship standings

References

External links
 Porsche Carrera Cup Great Britain

Porsche Carrera Cup GB
Porsche Carrera Cup Great Britain seasons